These 226 species belong to Aeolus, a genus of click beetles in the family Elateridae.

Aeolus species

 Aeolus abbreviatus 
 Aeolus achates 
 Aeolus adustus 
 Aeolus aequinoctialis 
 Aeolus africanus 
 Aeolus amabilis (LeConte, 1853)
 Aeolus amasius 
 Aeolus amicus 
 Aeolus anchoralis 
 Aeolus angustifrons 
 Aeolus antennatus 
 Aeolus apicalis 
 Aeolus apicatus 
 Aeolus apularis 
 Aeolus arcticollis 
 Aeolus asper 
 Aeolus atriceps 
 Aeolus barbisternus 
 Aeolus basalis 
 Aeolus basilaris 
 Aeolus batesi 
 Aeolus bicinctus 
 Aeolus bicolor 
 Aeolus bifasciatus 
 Aeolus bimucronatus 
 Aeolus binotatus 
 Aeolus biplagiatus 
 Aeolus bisellatus 
 Aeolus bisignatus 
 Aeolus bivittatus 
 Aeolus brevipennis 
 Aeolus brunneiventris 
 Aeolus brunneus 
 Aeolus calcaripilosus 
 Aeolus candezei 
 Aeolus capnurus 
 Aeolus centralis 
 Aeolus cibaensis 
 Aeolus cinctus 
 Aeolus circumcinctus 
 Aeolus circumscriptus 
 Aeolus comis 
 Aeolus concinnus 
 Aeolus corypheus 
 Aeolus cribratus 
 Aeolus crucifer 
 Aeolus cruciger 
 Aeolus cruentus 
 Aeolus crux 
 Aeolus cucullatus 
 Aeolus curtipennis 
 Aeolus cylindricollis 
 Aeolus cylindricus 
 Aeolus decoratus 
 Aeolus delectabilis 
 Aeolus depressus 
 Aeolus designatus 
 Aeolus dimidiatofasciatus 
 Aeolus diminutivus 
 Aeolus discicollis 
 Aeolus discoidalis 
 Aeolus discoideus 
 Aeolus distigma 
 Aeolus dorsalis (Say, 1823)
 Aeolus dorsiger 
 Aeolus dubius 
 Aeolus dugesi 
 Aeolus elegans 
 Aeolus elegantulus Burmeister, 1875
 Aeolus facetus Candèze, 1859
 Aeolus feretrum 
 Aeolus fissus 
 Aeolus flavipennis 
 Aeolus flavipes 
 Aeolus flavus 
 Aeolus fleutiauxi 
 Aeolus frivolus 
 Aeolus fumatus 
 Aeolus fuscatus 
 Aeolus galapagoensis 
 Aeolus garzoni 
 Aeolus gaudichaudi 
 Aeolus gavisus 
 Aeolus goyasiensis 
 Aeolus granulatus 
 Aeolus graphicus 
 Aeolus grouvellei 
 Aeolus haemorrhoidalis 
 Aeolus hexastigma 
 Aeolus ichnographicus 
 Aeolus indistinctus 
 Aeolus inquietus 
 Aeolus interruptus 
 Aeolus intricatus 
 Aeolus jeanneli 
 Aeolus krugi 
 Aeolus lateralis 
 Aeolus latifasciatus 
 Aeolus laureatus 
 Aeolus lepidulus 
 Aeolus lepidus 
 Aeolus leprieuri Candèze, 1859
 Aeolus liberalis 
 Aeolus lineatus 
 Aeolus litoris 
 Aeolus livens Candèze, 1881
 Aeolus longicollis 
 Aeolus longicornis 
 Aeolus macer 
 Aeolus macilentus 
 Aeolus maculatus 
 Aeolus mannerheimi Candèze, 1859
 Aeolus manni 
 Aeolus marginatus 
 Aeolus mauricei 
 Aeolus medianus 
 Aeolus mediofasciatus 
 Aeolus melanurus 
 Aeolus melinostictus 
 Aeolus melliculus Candèze, 1859
 Aeolus mellillus (Say, 1836)  (flat wireworm)
 Aeolus meridionalis 
 Aeolus minarum 
 Aeolus minimus 
 Aeolus minor 
 Aeolus minutissimus 
 Aeolus minutus 
 Aeolus mniszechi 
 Aeolus multisignatus 
 Aeolus mundicollis 
 Aeolus nanus 
 Aeolus nigriceps 
 Aeolus nigrinus 
 Aeolus nigritulus 
 Aeolus nigriventris 
 Aeolus nigrofasciatus 
 Aeolus nigromaculatus Drapiez, 1819
 Aeolus nobilis 
 Aeolus oberndorfferi 
 Aeolus obliquus 
 Aeolus octoguttatus 
 Aeolus opacus 
 Aeolus orpheus 
 Aeolus otti 
 Aeolus ovipennis 
 Aeolus palliatus 
 Aeolus panamensis 
 Aeolus parallelus 
 Aeolus parvulus Schwarz, 1903
 Aeolus pectoralis 
 Aeolus perversus 
 Aeolus pictus 
 Aeolus platynotus 
 Aeolus polleti 
 Aeolus polygrammus 
 Aeolus posticus 
 Aeolus praestans 
 Aeolus proletarius 
 Aeolus puerulus 
 Aeolus pulchellus 
 Aeolus pullatus 
 Aeolus pusillus 
 Aeolus pustulatus 
 Aeolus pyroplabtus 
 Aeolus quadriguttatus 
 Aeolus quadrimaculatus 
 Aeolus quinarius 
 Aeolus quintus 
 Aeolus reniger 
 Aeolus retrofasciatus Candèze, 1859
 Aeolus rodriguezi 
 Aeolus rubripennis 
 Aeolus ruficeps 
 Aeolus rugipennis 
 Aeolus sahlbergi 
 Aeolus sanguinicollis 
 Aeolus saulcyi 
 Aeolus scitus 
 Aeolus scriptus 
 Aeolus scutellatus (Schaeffer, 1917)
 Aeolus selliger 
 Aeolus sexguttatus 
 Aeolus sexmaculatus 
 Aeolus sexnotulatus 
 Aeolus sexplagiatus 
 Aeolus sexpustulatus 
 Aeolus sigillatus 
 Aeolus signatipennis Candèze, 1859
 Aeolus signatus Schwarz, 1902
 Aeolus signifer Candèze, 1859
 Aeolus simiolus 
 Aeolus simoni 
 Aeolus singularis 
 Aeolus sordidus 
 Aeolus steinheili 
 Aeolus stolatus 
 Aeolus subornatus (Schaeffer, 1917)
 Aeolus suturellus 
 Aeolus terminatus 
 Aeolus testudineus 
 Aeolus theridii 
 Aeolus thoracicus 
 Aeolus trachypygus 
 Aeolus trifasciatus 
 Aeolus trilineatus Candèze, 1859
 Aeolus trimaculatus 
 Aeolus tripartitus 
 Aeolus trisignatus 
 Aeolus tropicalis 
 Aeolus umbratus 
 Aeolus undulatus 
 Aeolus unicolor 
 Aeolus unifasciatus (Fabricius, 1801)
 Aeolus ustulatus 
 Aeolus variabilis 
 Aeolus variegatus 
 Aeolus variolatus Candèze, 1878
 Aeolus ventricosus 
 Aeolus venustus 
 Aeolus vermiculatus 
 Aeolus verruculosus 
 Aeolus virgatus 
 Aeolus virgulatus 
 Aeolus vittatus 
 Aeolus vulneratus 
 Aeolus yucatanus

References

Aeolus